Luis Neri Caballero Núñez (17 September 1962 – 6 May 2005) was a football defender from Paraguay. He played professional football in Paraguay, and had short spells in Argentina, in Deportivo Mandiyú. His son (born 1990), named Luis Caballero as well, also played professional football in Paraguay.

Career
A central defender, Caballero played for Club Guaraní, Club Olimpia, Club Sol de América and Deportivo Mandiyú. He played for Deportivo Mandiyú from 1990 to 1994.

Caballero made his international debut for the Paraguay national football team on 7 September 1988 in a friendly match against Ecuador (1-5 win) in Guayaquil. A participant at the 1986 FIFA World Cup in Mexico, he obtained a total number of 27 international caps from 1983 to 1989.

Personal
Caballero was killed during a robbery at his office in Villa Morra on 6 May 2005.

References

External links

1962 births
2005 deaths
Sportspeople from Asunción
Paraguayan footballers
Paraguay international footballers
Association football central defenders
1986 FIFA World Cup players
1989 Copa América players
Club Guaraní players
Club Olimpia footballers
Textil Mandiyú footballers
Paraguayan expatriate footballers
Expatriate footballers in Argentina
Male murder victims
Paraguayan murder victims
People murdered in Paraguay
2005 murders in Paraguay